is a former Japanese football player.

Playing career
After graduating from Shimizu Commercial High School, he joined the J1 League club Júbilo Iwata in 1996. However he did not play at all, less than either Tomoaki Ogami or Yushi Ozaki. In April 2000, he moved to Verdy Kawasaki. However he did not play much there wither, less than Kenji Honnami. In June 2000, he moved to Consadole Sapporo. Although he played in the last three matches of the 2000 season, he played less than Yohei Sato. In 2002, he moved to FC Tokyo. However he still did not play much, less than Yoichi Doi. In 2003, he moved to Shonan Bellmare. He battled with Masahito Suzuki for a position and he played often. In 2005, he became a regular goalkeeper. However gradually played less often, in favor of new member Tomohiko Ito in 2006. In 2007, he moved to the Japan Football League club Rosso Kumamoto (later Roasso Kumamoto). He became a regular goalkeeper and played in all matches during the 2007 season. The club was promoted to the J2 League in 2008. However his opportunity to play decreased after that, and he retired at the end of the 2009 season.

Club statistics

References

External links

1977 births
Living people
Association football people from Shizuoka Prefecture
Japanese footballers
J1 League players
J2 League players
Japan Football League players
Júbilo Iwata players
Tokyo Verdy players
Hokkaido Consadole Sapporo players
FC Tokyo players
Shonan Bellmare players
Roasso Kumamoto players
Association football goalkeepers